Brain Storm is the name of three fictional characters appearing in the comics published by DC Comics. The first Brain Storm appeared in Justice League of America #32 (December 1964) and was created by writer Gardner Fox and artist Mike Sekowsky.

Brainstorm made his first live-action debut on the fourth season of The Flash, portrayed by Kendrick Sampson.

Fictional character biography

Axel Storm
Axel Storm had created a special helmet that allowed him to absorb stellar energy, which he could use to create virtually anything which his imagination could conceive. This invention having warped his mind, Brain Storm witnessed his brother Fred's apparent death. In his twisted ideals, Brain Storm had captured the Justice League so that they could witness him taking justice into his own hands and killing the man responsible for his brother's demise. Part of his plan involved stealing the powers and abilities from the Justice League members and redistributing them to random people.
However, a side effect to Brain Storm's power was that whoever the power was used upon could also access the energy abilities and the JLA members were suddenly mentally linked to the people who had gained their abilities. Transporting them to Brain Storm's base, their arrival freed the Justice League from Brain Storm's trap and they fought against him.

They battled a group of stellar-energy powered threats, and came to realize who it was that Brain Storm blamed for his brothers death – the Green Lantern. However, Green Lantern explained that due to Brain Storm's interference with his attempt to capture Fred (who just robbed a bank), the combination of both their powers transported Fred to France and erased his memories.

Bringing Fred to them and restoring his memory, the Justice League convinced Brain Storm to end his vendetta against the Green Lantern. However, Brain Storm realized that escape was the best course of action and teleported away without a trace, leaving the JLA to turn his brother over to the police.

Brain Storm soon returned however to plague the League once again. This time, he used his powers to give each team member a severe physical disability. Superman was struck blind, Flash's legs were fused together, Green Arrow suddenly had no arms, Green Lantern began to stutter both literally and mentally, and Hawkman developed breathing problems. In spite of these handicaps, the JLA managed to overcome the odds and fight back against Brain Storm. After the battle, Brain Storm restored all the JLA members back to normal.

Brain Storm retaliated though and used his power to create duplicates of himself. He also succeeded in capturing the League, turning all but Batman into his drone slaves. Finally determining which foe was the real Brain Storm, Batman knocked him out, relinquishing his control over the JLA members.

Some years later, Brain Storm turned up again, this time without the benefit of his powers. He kidnapped the Terrorsmith in the hopes of using his powers to reactivate his own lost abilities. This plan proved unsuccessful however, and the Terrorsmith was able to escape.

Brain Storm, or someone dressed like Brain Storm, was one of many costumed villains who attended Roulette's "House of Pain", although he did not participate in any of the exhibition events. It is unclear whether this was actually Brain Storm himself, or perhaps one of the other spectators who enjoyed dressing up as a famous super-villain.

Alan Barnes
A different version of Brainstorm named Alan Barnes appears in S.T.A.R. Corps. A research volunteer with artificially generated psionic abilities created by S.T.A.R. Labs. He uncovers the true nature of the Mindgame computer and the Gamesman units.

Dominic Lanse
A new Brainstorm debuted against Michael Holt, but is not related to the original. He is Dominic Lanse, a silicon valley scientist who was working on downloading unique intellects into machines. His success was reversed by an accident that let him reverse the process and transfer those intellects into himself. But Mister Terrific is able to supercharge his mind with the T-Spheres rendering him unconscious. It is also revealed that this version is indirectly responsible for the death of Holt's wife.

Other versions

DC Animated Universe Comics
The original Brainstorm appears in Justice League Unlimited #8 set in the DC Animated Universe.

DC Super Friends
Brainstorm appears in DC Super Friends.

Brainstorm (Post-Zero Hour)
A version of Brainstorm appears in Legion Worlds comics.

In other media
Kendrick Sampson portrays Dominic Lanse in The Flash. A metahuman who gained the power of telepathy, he is kidnapped and injured by Amunet Black, but is saved by Team Flash. However, Lanse is later kidnapped by Amunet again and sold to the Thinker, who puts his own consciousness inside Dominic's body. While in Dominic's body, the Thinker frames Barry Allen for Clifford DeVoe's "murder" and uses Dominic's powers to transfer himself into Hazard's body, steal Kilg%re, Dwarfstar, and Black Bison's powers, and temporarily negate Killer Frost's powers via a mental block until she was pushed to an emotional limit in the show's fifth season.

References

External links
 
 Brain Storm (Axel Storm) at DC Comics Wiki
 

Characters created by Gardner Fox
Characters created by Mike Sekowsky
DC Comics supervillains 
DC Comics characters who have mental powers
DC Comics telekinetics 
DC Comics telepaths
Comics characters introduced in 1964